Ny is a village of Wallonia in the municipality and district of Hotton, located in the province of Luxembourg, Belgium.

Description
Ny is a member of the Les Plus Beaux Villages de Wallonie, with buildings of traditional limestone or of half timbered brick construction.

The village has a large quadrilateral castle; a "château ferme" (fortified farmhouse) dating to the 17th century, a church (Notre-Dame de l'Assomption), and several chapels: Saint-Donat; Saint-Gerard; Saint-Joseph; Saint-Roch; Saint-Anne; and the chapelle de la Sainte-Familie.

References

External links

Populated places in Luxembourg (Belgium)
Hotton